Qarah Qassab (also Romanized as Qarah Qaşşāb and Qareh Qaşşāb) is a village in Almahdi Rural District, Mohammadyar District, Naqadeh County, West Azerbaijan Province, Iran. At the 2006 census, its population was 731, in 157 families.

References 

Populated places in Naqadeh County